Bridgnorth District was, between 1974 and 2009, a local government district in Shropshire, England. Its main town was Bridgnorth and other towns in its area were Much Wenlock, Shifnal and Broseley. The villages of Albrighton and Sheriffhales as well as RAF Cosford were also in the district.

History
The district was formed on 1 April 1974, under the Local Government Act 1972. The district covered the former Bridgnorth Rural District, and nearly all of the Shifnal Rural District, excluding a small part of Shifnal parish within the area of Telford New Town, which went to Wrekin district. The former municipal boroughs of Much Wenlock and Bridgnorth had been converted into rural boroughs in 1966 and 1967 respectively, making them part of Bridgnorth Rural District whilst retaining some of their civic dignities such as the right to appoint a mayor.

The new district created in 1974 was administered by Bridgnorth District Council until abolition on 31 March 2009. From 1 April 2009 the area was administered by the new Shropshire unitary authority created as part of the 2009 structural changes to local government in England.

Energy policy 

In May 2006, a report commissioned by British Gas  showed that housing in the district of Bridgnorth produced the 12th highest average carbon emissions in the country at 7,176 kg of carbon dioxide per dwelling.

Political control
The first elections to the council were held in 1973, initially operating as a shadow authority until coming into its powers on 1 April 1974. Political control of the council from 1974 until its abolition in 2009 was held by the following parties:

Leadership
The last leader of the council was Elizabeth Yeomans, an independent.

Council elections
1973 Bridgnorth District Council election
1976 Bridgnorth District Council election
1979 Bridgnorth District Council election (New ward boundaries)
1983 Bridgnorth District Council election
1987 Bridgnorth District Council election
1991 Bridgnorth District Council election (District boundary changes took place but the number of seats remained the same)
1995 Bridgnorth District Council election
1999 Bridgnorth District Council election
2003 Bridgnorth District Council election (New ward boundaries)
2007 Bridgnorth District Council election

By-election results

References

English districts abolished in 2009
Districts of England established in 1974
Former non-metropolitan districts of Shropshire
Bridgnorth
Council elections in Shropshire
District council elections in England